Rajbari-1 is a constituency represented in the Jatiya Sangsad (National Parliament) of Bangladesh since 2008 by Kazi Keramat Ali of the Awami League.

Boundaries 
The constituency encompasses Goalanda and Rajbari Sadar upazilas.

History 
The constituency was created in 1984 from a Faridpur constituency when the former Faridpur District was split into five districts: Rajbari, Faridpur, Gopalganj, Madaripur, and Shariatpur.

Members of Parliament

Elections

Elections in the 2010s 
Kazi Keramat Ali was re-elected unopposed in the 2014 general election after opposition parties withdrew their candidacies in a boycott of the election.

Elections in the 2000s

Elections in the 1990s 

Md. Abdul Wajed Chowdhury died in office. Kazi Keramat Ali was elected in an October 1992 by-election.

References

External links
 

Parliamentary constituencies in Bangladesh
Rajbari District